Lyndsey Alex Harkin (née Cunningham; born 30 August 1991) is a former youth England women's international footballer. Harkin has played for Doncaster Rovers Belles of the Women's Super League and for her hometown club Nottingham Forest.

References

External links

Women's association football midfielders
1991 births
Living people
Women's Super League players
Doncaster Rovers Belles L.F.C. players
England women's youth international footballers
Footballers from Nottingham
FA Women's National League players
Nottingham Forest Women F.C. players
English women's footballers